Exelis Inc., was a global aerospace, defense, information and services company created in October 2011 as a result of the spinoff of ITT Corporation's defense business into an independent, publicly traded company. The company was headquartered in Tysons Corner, Virginia, USA and was led by CEO and President David F. Melcher. The Washington Post highlighted Exelis as a top company in the Washington, D.C. region in 2011. It was acquired by the Harris Corporation for $4.75 billion in 2015.

History
For more detailed company history prior to October 31, 2011, see ITT Corporation

Exelis Inc. was one of three major companies that made up ITT Corporation, a company that provided numerous communications, defense and water services.
ITT was founded as the small communications company Puerto Rico Telephone Company by brothers Sosthenes and Hernan Behn. Through a series of business and patent acquisitions, the company grew and was renamed International Telephone and Telegraph in 1920.
ITT continued to grow before appointing Harold Geneen as CEO in 1959. Until his retirement from the position in 1977, Geneen was responsible for growing the company from a medium-sized business earning $765 million in 1961 to an international conglomerate making $17 billion in sales in 1970. The company acquired more than 350 companies during Geneen's tenure; at one point the acquisition rate reached one deal per week. Ownership extended over such notable companies as Continental Baking, maker of Wonder Bread and the Twinkie, Sheraton Hotels and Avis Rent-A-Car. For a brief period in the mid-1960s, ITT was in talks to acquire the ABC television and radio networks in the US, but that deal fell through under regulatory scrutiny.

Following Geneen's retirement, ITT went through a restructuring phase under CEO Rand Araskog and was split into three companies in 1995: ITT Corporation (formerly ITT Industries), ITT Sheraton, and The Hartford, an insurance company.

2011 Spin-Off
On January 12, 2011, the ITT Corporation Board of Directors approved a plan to split the firm. On October 31, 2011, ITT Corporation spun off its defense and water technology businesses to form three separate, publicly traded companies:
 Exelis Inc., a global aerospace, defense, information and services company headquartered in Tysons Corner, Virginia.
 Xylem Inc., a water technology firm.
 ITT Corporation, a manufacturing firm.

From the spin off to Nov. 1, 2013, Exelis was known as ITT Exelis to help ease the transition of the company's brand. Exelis employed approximately 19,000 people and generated $5.5 billion in sales in 2012.

On February 13, 2013, Exelis announced that it would be closing its West Springfield manufacturing plant and laying off 200 employees after citing expected cuts in U.S. defense spending.

2015 Purchase
In February 2015, Exelis announced that plans had been approved for the sale of the company through a cash/stock purchase to competitor Harris Corporation.  The purchase price of 4.75 billion dollars was reported as being one of the highest such defense company purchases, since the Lockheed/Martin merger.  When finalized in June 2015, the purchase was expected to make Harris/Exelis one of the top 10 defense contractors in the United States.

Company structure
Exelis had six businesses that specialize in different technologies and services.

Aerostructures
Located in Salt Lake City, Utah the Exelis Aerostructures business is a designer and manufacturer of lightweight composite aerospace structures, subassemblies and components.

Major Products:
Exelis Aerostructures is a subcontractor for the Boeing 7-series family of aircraft, including composite air-frame substructures for the 787 Dreamliner, the Airbus A380 aircraft as well as the Sikorsky S-76 helicopter. For defense programs, they provide complete structural assemblies, flight critical components as well as primary and secondary structural elements for platforms such as the Lockheed Martin F-35 Lightning II, the Sikorsky CH-53K King Stallion Heavy Lift Helicopter, the Boeing C-17 Globemaster III and the Lockheed Martin Joint Air-to-Surface Standoff Missile (JASSM). Exelis also produces the Bear Claw line of down-hole drillable plugs used in oil and gas well completions.

Electronic Systems
Headquartered in Clifton, New Jersey, with a major division in Salt Lake City, Utah, the electronics systems division of the company offers a variety of electronic warfare and surveillance technologies, including air traffic control technology for both military and domestic use, radar and sonar systems, antennas and signal-jamming devices to disarm improvised explosive devices (IED).

Major Products:
 ALQ-214 IDECM (Integrated Electronic Countermeasures)

Geospatial Systems
With facilities located in Clifton, New Jersey and Rochester, New York, the geospatial systems division manufactures and provides GPS technology (Clifton), surveillance systems (Rochester) and data encryption services, as well as remote sensing and navigation technology. The company also included facilities in Ft. Wayne that designed and manufactured instruments for weather tracking system..

Major Products and Solutions:

Information Systems
The information systems division is headquartered in Herndon, Virginia. The division specializes in creating secure information and electronics systems for specific and often challenging environments, including defense and intelligence missions, the Census Bureau, homeland security, air traffic control and space missions.

Mission Systems
Headquartered in Colorado Springs, Colorado., Mission systems provides facilities, engineering, logistics and security support for U.S. military bases domestically and abroad.

Night Vision & Communications Solutions
Located in Ft. Wayne, Indiana and Roanoke, Virginia, Exelis Night Vision & Communications Solutions (NVCS) provides products and services for secure voice and data communications, battlefield situational awareness, and night vision systems in the global defense, security, and battlefield management sectors.

Major Products
 SINCGARS – Single Channel Ground and Airborne Radio System, military communications system.
 GNOMAD (Global Network On the Move – Active Distribution), satellite military data communications system

Exelis Action Corps
Exelis Action Corps is the company's volunteer-service program designed to create large-scale, team and individual volunteer activities and projects to support and engage service members, veterans and their families in local communities. Activities can range from providing interviewing coaching to a military service member, to painting a house for a disabled veteran, to tutoring the children of a service member serving abroad.

Leadership

Board of Directors
 Ralph W. Hake
Chairman of the Board
 David F. Melcher
Chief Executive Officer
 John J. Hamre
 Paul J. Kern
 Herman E. Bulls
 Patrick Moore
 Mark L. Reuss
 Billie I. Williamson
 R. David Yost

Management Team
 David F. Melcher
President
 Peter J. Milligan
Chief Financial Officer
 Ann D. Davidson
Chief Legal Officer
 A. John Procopio
Chief Human Resources Officer
 Robert E. Durbin
Strategy and Government Relations
 Mike Blair
Vice President of Aerostructures
 Richard D. Sorelle
President of Electronic Systems
 Christopher D. Young
President of Geospatial Systems
 Pamela A. Drew
President of Information Systems
 Kenneth W. Hunzeker
President of Mission Systems
 David J. Albritton
Chief Communications Officer
 Nicholas E. Bobay
President of Night Vision & Communications Systems
 Vincent Thomas
Vice President of Operations
 Katy Herr
Vice President of Investor Relations

Customers

Customers currently include:
 US Army
 US Navy
 US Air Force
 US Marine Corps
 Department of Homeland Security
 Federal Aviation Administration
 NASA
The company also has clients in more than 50 countries in Europe, the Americas, Asia, the Middle East and Africa, as well as Australia.

References

External links
 

2015 mergers and acquisitions
Aerospace companies of the United States
Companies based in Fairfax County, Virginia
Companies formerly listed on the New York Stock Exchange
Corporate spin-offs
Defense companies of the United States
ITT Inc.
L3Harris Technologies
Manufacturing companies established in 2011
Manufacturing companies based in Virginia